William Ernest Rammell (born 10 October 1959) is a British Labour Party politician, who was the Member of Parliament (MP) for Harlow from 1997 until 2010, and served as a Minister of State in several departments from 2002. From August 2012 to December 2019 he was Vice-Chancellor of the University of Bedfordshire. He was chair of the university consortium MillionPlus from June to December 2019. In August 2021 he became president of the University of Kurdistan Hewler in Iraqi Kurdistan.

Political career
Rammell joined Tony Blair's government in October 2002 as an assistant whip but was promoted two weeks later to be a spokesperson for the Foreign and Commonwealth Office. Rammell, a pro-European, was supportive of joining the Euro, and until 2002 he was Chair of Labour Movement for Europe. In September 2004, he was the first British government minister to visit North Korea.

In the 2005 general election, Rammell held his seat with the third smallest majority of any Labour MP, at just 97 votes. The result was not declared until two days after voting, following four recounts.

In May 2005, Rammell was made Minister of State for Higher Education. He was strongly supportive of top-up fees, arguing in 2005 that without such fees it would be necessary to put "3p or 4p on the standard rate of tax". In September 2007, he withdrew funding from some adult and continuing education courses in universities.

In February 2008, Rammell announced plans to create a national database of children's school records and exam results which would make up a publicly owned CV. The CV and "Learner Number" would stay with the child throughout adult life until retirement and only the British government would be able to remove records from their database entry. The plan would only have applied to English children, with education being a devolved matter.

In October 2008, Rammell returned to the Foreign Office as Minister of State, and in June 2009, was moved again to the Ministry of Defence as Minister of State for the Armed Forces. He defended the Brown government's levels of spending on equipment in Afghanistan, following a soldier's death because of a lack of available helicopters.

In September 2009, Rammell confirmed he had told Libya that the Prime Minister did not want to see convicted Lockerbie bomber Abdelbaset al-Megrahi, who had been serving a life sentence, die in prison.

In October 2009, following Sir Thomas Legg's audit, Rammell was ordered to repay £2,782 of wrongful expenses claims.

In the 2010 general election, Rammell was defeated in Harlow by Conservative candidate Robert Halfon, who gained the seat with a majority of 4,925 votes.

In August 2012, Rammell was appointed Vice-Chancellor of the University of Bedfordshire. He held the position until 2019. He had previously worked for Plymouth University as Deputy Vice-Chancellor with responsibility for student experience and internationalisation.

References

External links
 Ministerial responsibilities – DIUS
 Guardian Unlimited Politics – Ask Aristotle: Bill Rammell MP
 TheyWorkForYou.com Bill Rammell MP
 BBC Politics page

News items
 Visiting Israel in June 2007
 Getting poor people to university in November 2006
 Visiting Cuba in March 2005
 Visiting North Korea in September 2004
 Talking to BBC Breakfast about Harlow in July 2002

1959 births
Living people
Alumni of Cardiff University
Harlow
Labour Party (UK) MPs for English constituencies
People associated with the University of Bedfordshire
People associated with the University of Plymouth
People from Islington (district)
UK MPs 1997–2001
UK MPs 2001–2005
UK MPs 2005–2010
Ministers for Universities (United Kingdom)
Labour Party (UK) councillors
Councillors in Essex